Ocotillo Wells is an unincorporated community in San Diego County, California, United States. The name became official in 1962 when it was adopted for federal use by the US Board on Geographic Names. A federally recognized variant name, Ocotillo, can cause confusion with the community of Ocotillo, California in Imperial County,  to the south on Interstate 8.

The ZIP Code is 92004 and the community is in area code 760. The number prefix for wired telephones is 767, which is shared with Borrego Springs.

Local landmarks
Ocotillo Wells County Airport has two dirt runways. Runway extents are marked by white paving blocks. Gasoline is available in Borrego Springs ( west), in Westmorland ( east) and at the Blu-In Cafe ( east). Gas may not always be available the Blu-In Cafe which, besides the gas station, operates a restaurant, store, and RV park. Gas has not been available at the Blu-In since 2011.

Several other small businesses sell off-road accessories and rent all-terrain vehicles. Most businesses in the area are closed during the summer months. My Desert Rose, which was a traditional restaurant located at the intersection of State Route 78 and Split Mountain Road, burned down in 2008.

Both of these businesses are open part-time during the summer and full-time during the cooler months. The Split Mountain Store stocks groceries, beer, and parts for sand buggies and trucks. The Iron Door, a small bar, has a private club, two pool tables and serves beer, wine and some food. Local artifacts are on display in the bar, where several layers of decorated dollar bills are stapled to the walls.

Climate
Ocotillo Wells has a hot desert climate (Köppen climate classification: BWh) with short, mild winters and long, extremely hot summers.

Education
There are no schools in Ocotillo Wells. The community is served by the Borrego Springs Unified School District.

Off-road recreation
The California Department of Parks and Recreation operates the Ocotillo Wells State Vehicle Recreation Area which borders the community. This off-road vehicle area is part of the department's Southern Division, Ocotillo Wells District which is headquartered in Borrego Springs.

Free camping is available at numerous locations along State Route 78. The most popular of these are Main Street, Holmes Camp, County Line Road, and Pole Line Road. Each of these areas have ample access to numerous trails that provide a challenge to riders of all skill levels. Any vehicle with a license plate or off-road registration is able to operate in the park.

Natural features in the park include:
 Blowsand Hill, visible from State Route 78 and located between Ranger Station Road and Main Street
 Devil's Slide, a small sand dune adjacent to a steep rocky hill
 Shell Reef
 Gas Dome
 Pumpkin Patch

A map of these locations as well as numerous other trails is available at the ranger station.

Military plane crashes in 2020 
On 29 September 2020, around 4:00 PM, a US Marine Corps (USMC) F-35B fighter aircraft was involved in a mid-air collision with a USMC KC-130J tanker during an aerial refueling exercise. The F-35B crashed near Ocotillo Wells in front of civilian onlookers who recorded the impact, with its pilot able to eject safely. The KC-130J made an emergency wheels-up landing in an agricultural field near Thermal, California, with all eight crew members surviving.

In popular culture
Part of the 1971 film, The Andromeda Strain, was filmed on location in Ocotillo Wells, which featured an agricultural station and planted fields that were specifically constructed for the film.

See also
 Anza Borrego Desert State Park
 Borrego Springs, California
 Borrego Valley Maneuver Area
 Salton Sea
 Westmorland, California

References

External links
 California State Parks: Ocotillo Wells State Vehicular Recreation Area (SVRA)
 California State Parks: Map of Ocotillo Wells SVRA
 Ocotillo Wells SVRA: Trail Maps

Populated places in the Colorado Desert
Unincorporated communities in San Diego County, California
Unincorporated communities in California